In common law jurisdictions, an acquittal certifies that the accused is free from the charge of an offense, as far as criminal law is concerned. The finality of an acquittal is dependent on the jurisdiction. In some countries, such as the United States, an acquittal prohibits the retrial of the accused for the same offense, even if new evidence surfaces that further implicates the accused. The effect of an acquittal on criminal proceedings is the same whether it results from a jury verdict or results from the operation of some other rule that discharges the accused. In other countries, the prosecuting authority may appeal an acquittal similar to how a defendant may appeal a conviction.

Scotland

Scots law has two acquittal verdicts: not guilty and not proven. However a verdict of "not proven" does not give rise to the double jeopardy rule.

England and Wales

In England and Wales, which share a common legal system, the Criminal Justice Act 2003 creates an exception to the double jeopardy rule, by providing that retrials may be ordered if "new and compelling evidence" comes to light after an acquittal for a serious crime. Also, the Criminal Procedure and Investigations Act 1996 permits a "tainted acquittal" to be set aside in circumstances where it is proved beyond reasonable doubt that an acquittal has been obtained by violence or threats of violence to a witness or juror/s.

In modern England and Wales, and in all countries that substantially follow English criminal procedure, an acquittal normally results in the immediate liberation of the defendant from custody, assuming no other charges against the defendant remain to be tried. However, until 1774 a defendant acquitted by an English or Welsh court would be remanded to jail until he had paid the jailer for the costs of his confinement. It was known for acquitted persons to die in jail for lack of jailer's fees.

United States

With one exception, in the United States an acquittal cannot be appealed by the prosecution because of constitutional prohibitions against double jeopardy. The U.S. Supreme Court has ruled:

If the judgment is upon an acquittal, the defendant, indeed, will not seek to have it reversed, and the government cannot. U.S. v. Sanges, 144 U.S. 310 (1892). Ball v. U.S., 163 U.S. 662, 671 (1896)

A verdict of acquittal, although not followed by any judgment, is a bar to a subsequent prosecution for the same offense. Ball, supra, at 672.

Society's awareness of the heavy personal strain which a criminal trial represents for the individual defendant is manifested in the willingness to limit the Government to a single criminal proceeding to vindicate its very vital interest in enforcement of criminal laws. United States v. Jorn, 400 U.S. 470, 479 (1971)

Whether the trial is to a jury or, as here, to the bench, subjecting the defendant to postacquittal factfinding proceedings going to guilt or innocence violates the Double Jeopardy Clause. Smalis v. Pennsylvania, 476 U.S. 140 (1986)

It was decided in Fong Foo v. United States, 369 U.S. 141 (1962) that the prosecution cannot appeal a judgment of acquittal by a jury. In United States v. Jenkins, 420 U.S. 358 (1975), this was held applicable to bench trials. In Arizona v. Rumsey, 467 U.S. 203 (1984), it was ruled that in a bench trial, when a judge was holding a separate hearing after the jury trial, to decide if the defendant should be sentenced to death or life imprisonment, the judge decided that the circumstances of the case did not permit death to be imposed. On appeal, the judge's ruling was found to be erroneous. However, even though the decision to impose a life sentence instead of death was based on the judge's erroneous interpretation of the law, the finding of life imprisonment in the original case constituted an acquittal of the death penalty. Thus death could not be imposed upon a subsequent trial. Even though the acquittal of the death penalty was erroneous in that case, the acquittal must stand.

The only exception to an acquittal being final is if the defendant was never in actual jeopardy. If a defendant bribes a judge and obtains acquittal as a result of a bench trial, the acquittal is invalid because the defendant was never in jeopardy in the first place. Harry Aleman v. Judges of the Criminal Division, Circuit Court of Cook County, Illinois, et al., 138 F.3d 302 (7th Cir. 1998).

An acquittal, while conclusive as to the criminal law, does not necessarily bar private civil actions in tort or on some other grounds as a result of the facts alleged in the charge. For example, the City of Los Angeles was held liable in 1994 for the 1991 Rodney King beating despite state acquittals in 1992 of all four of its four main LAPD defendants, and in 1997 O. J. Simpson was held civilly liable for wrongful death even after being tried and acquitted in 1995 of murder. An acquittal also does not bar prosecution for the same offenses under a statute of a different jurisdiction. For example, in the United States, someone acquitted of a state murder charge can be retried for the same actions on a federal charge of violating civil rights, and police acquitted of a state charge of felonious assault, as in the Rodney King case, can likewise be tried on federal civil rights charges.

See also 
Category:Criminal trials that ended in acquittal

References

Criminal procedure